Songs for the Exhausted is the fourth full-length studio album by Austrian indie-band Naked Lunch. It was received with critical praise in Germany and Austria and sold surprisingly well. It was the band's first album after a five year-hiatus, following the flopping of Love Junkies, which caused them being dropped by their record label. Recorded in the wake of this backslashing event, most of the songs are dominated by a sad, bleak tone. Also, one of the songs, "King George" was written about the death of the group ex-bass player, Georg Timber-Trattnig.

The album was followed by several tours and an EP (Stay), in 2005.

Track listing (CD)
 God  – 4:52
 First Man on the Sun  – 3:51
 King George  – 3:37
 Stay  – 4:38
 Lost it all  – 3:04
 In your Room  – 4:37
 The Deal  – 3:54
 Man without Past  – 4:05
 Solitude  – 4:15
 The Retainer  – 3:51

Credits
All songs/lyrics by Oliver Welter, all music by Oliver Welter, Herwig Zamernik, Stefan Deisenberger and Olaf Opal.

Played by Naked Lunch: Oliver Welter (vocals and guitar), Herwig Zamernik (bass guitar), Stefan Deisenberger (keyboards), Thorsten Thonhauser (drums) and Olaf Opal (electronics).

with guests:
Mario Kofler - drums on 1/5/9
Ingo Weber - drums on 2/7
Michi Malicka - bass on 1/5
Ritchi Klammer - horns on 2/8
Sebastian Schumacher - cello on 10
Klaus Lippitsch - percussions

Miscellanea
Videos were made for"God" and "Stay", by befriended film-maker Thomas Woschitz. They later accused the German metal band Rammstein of copying their "God" video for one of their own videos, "Ohne dich".
"Stay" was released as the sole single/EP, in 2005.

2004 albums